Tom Lloyd (born 1979) is a British novelist. He is the author of the Twilight Reign series.

Biography
Tom Lloyd was born in the UK and studied Politics and International Relations at Southampton University. He started writing after university and took a job in publishing where he still works. He currently lives in Oxford.

Bibliography

The Twilight Reign
Comprising:
 The Stormcaller (2006)
 The Twilight Herald (2007)
 The Grave Thief (2008)
 The Ragged Man (2010)
 The Dusk Watchman (2012)
 The God Tattoo, and other short stories of the Land (2013)

Empire of a Hundred Houses
 Moon's Artifice (2014)
 Old Man's Ghosts (2015)

The God Fragments
The God Fragments is a heroic fantasy series set in a world where polities compete for so-called god fragments, necessary catalysts to creating the elemental ammunition for mage-guns. God fragments, therefore, are a critical resource for maintaining military independence. The series includes:
 Stranger of Tempest (2016)
 Princess of Blood (2017)
 Knight of Stars (2019)
 God of Night (2020)

References

External links
 
 

1979 births
Living people
English male novelists